Emerald Bay is in Smith County, Texas, United States. It is located on the eastern side of Lake Palestine near Bullard, Texas. It is a census-designated place (CDP) created for the 2010 census. Emerald Bay had a population of 1,146 as of the 2020 census.

Demographics 

As of the 2020 United States census, there were 1,146 people, 442 households, and 361 families residing in the CDP.

References 

Census-designated places in Smith County, Texas
Census-designated places in Texas